The women's 200 metre breaststroke competition of the 2018 FINA World Swimming Championships (25 m) was held on 16 December 2018.

Records
Prior to the competition, the existing world and championship records were as follows.

Results

Heats
The heats were started on 16 December at 9:52.

Final
The final was held on 16 December at 18:41.

References

Women's 200 metre breaststroke